Kariyannur  is a village in Thrissur district in the state of Kerala, India.

Demographics
 India census, Kariyannur had a population of 6000 with 2906 males and 3094 females.

References

Villages in Thrissur district